Orthochoriolaus chihuahuae is a species of beetle in the family Cerambycidae, the only species in the genus Orthochoriolaus.

References

Lepturinae